Sonia Chadwick Hawkes,  (5 November 1933 – 30 May 1999) was a leading specialist in early Anglo-Saxon archaeology, described as a "discerning systematiser of the great array of Anglo-Saxon grave furnishings". She led major excavations on Anglo-Saxon cemeteries at Finglesham in Kent and Worthy Park in Hampshire.

Biography

Early life 
Born Sonia Elizabeth Chadwick, on 5 November 1933 in Crayford, she was the only child of Albert Andrew Chadwick and Doris Chadwick (formerly Doris Benger). The Oxford Dictionary of National Biography notes that Albert Andrew Chadwick was an engineer, but gives no information on Doris Chadwick beyond her name.

Sonia Chadwick excavated at Lullingstone Roman Villa (Kent) as a school girl, and at an early medieval site at Morgan Porth (Cornwall) from 1951 to 1953. The experience at Morgan Porth shaped her later interest in early medieval archaeology. She studied English at Bedford College, University of London, before undertaking post-graduate research supervised by Vera I. Evison.

Career 

In 1956 Chadwick began a multi-year excavation at a prehistoric site on Longbridge Deverill Cow Down in Wiltshire. The work was carried out for the Ministry of Works and concluded in 1960.

Chadwick contributed to the inaugural volume of Medieval Archaeology in 1957, published by the recently established Society for Medieval Archaeology; she edited a posthumous article on the early medieval art of the Jutes from Anglo-Saxonist Edward Thurlow Leeds. Chadwick's early research explored the decorated metalwork found in early medieval graves. She produced a study re-assessment of 1920s finds from the Anglo-Saxon cemetery at Finglesham, a prelude to her own excavations there from 1959. The field of Anglo-Saxon archaeology developed significantly in the early 20th century with systematic approaches to data; Hawkes was part of a wave of archaeologists including J. N. L. Myres, Vera Evison, and Audrey Meaney who continued this trend, investigating cemeteries to explore the history of England in the early Middle Ages.

In 1958, she was appointed Curator of Scunthorpe Museum. The museum took over excavations at an Anglian cemetery in Fonaby, Lincolnshire; Chadwick was responsible for the finds and began indexing them – a project which was built on by Alison M. Cook and the finished product published in more than two decades later.

Chadwick spoke about the work at Longbridge Deverill at the 'Problems relating to the Iron Age in Southern Britain' conference in December that year, organised by the Council for British Archaeology at the Institute of Archaeology in Oxford. Chadwick met fellow archaeologist Christopher Hawkes at the conference and they married in January 1959. She left Scunthorpe Museum in 1959 to join the Institute of Archaeology at the University of Oxford, where Christopher lectured, as a research assistant. She remained with the institute, later becoming a lecturer, until she retired in 1994. Christopher joined Sonia at Longbridge Deverill for the final season of excavation in 1960, which Paul Ashbee described as a "honeymoon joint enterprise".

From 1959 to 1967, Hawkes led excavations at Finglesham Anglo-Saxon cemetery in Kent. Hawkes was elected a Fellow of the Society of Antiquaries (FSA) in 1961. Between 1961 and 1962, she also led excavations at an Anglo-Saxon cemetery at Worthy Park in Hampshire. From 1963 to 1971, Hawkes catalogued a collection of finds from the 18th-century antiquarian Bryan Faussett.

Hawkes' research focus was on Anglo Saxon cemeteries in Kent.  A major piece of work on Late Roman zoomorphic belt fittings, "Soldiers and settlers", prompted much debate. Written in collaboration with Gerald Dunning, the influential paper was also translated into German. In the 1960s Hawkes began a reassessment of material excavated at Sarre and Bifrons in the 19th century. The results were not published in her lifetime. 

In 1973 Hawkes was appointed lecturer in European archaeology at the University of Oxford. Updown early medieval cemetery in Kent was discovered that year, about a mile from the site of the Finglesham cemetery. Hawkes became interested in the site due to its proximity to Finglesham where she had already worked; she worked with the owners and they commissioned them to conduct a rescue excavation in 1976 ahead of the East Kent Water Board's plans to run a pipeline through the site. The work uncovered 36 graves, but further excavation was curtained after one of the landowners died, and Hawkes spent time publishing the results of the excavation. 

The 1970s saw an increasing number of studies in the field of Anglo-Saxon archaeology; in the context of creating new venues for publication of detailed studies, Hawkes supported the foundation of the British Archaeological Reports book series. She was had an advisory editorial role and the first book in the series was written by one of Hawkes' research students, Tania Dickinson. In 1979 she co-founded the publication series Anglo-Saxon Studies in Archaeology and History with James Campbell and David Brown, and organised a series of interdisciplinary seminars and conferences in Anglo Saxon studies. The first two volumes of Anglo-Saxon Studies in Archaeology and History were published in the British Archaeological Reports book series. Sonia co-edited Greeks, Celts and Romans with her husband, Christopher Hawkes. Sonia spent time caring for her husband as his health declined.

Hawkes retired in 1994. The following year she married Svetislav Petkovic. She died in Oxford on 30 May 1999, having been diagnosed with cancer.

Reception and legacy

At the time of her death, Hawkes had several unpublished projects, including a full write-up of the excavations at the early medieval cemetery at Finglesham. The Sonia Hawkes Archive, notes on unpublished excavations, was established at the University of Oxford. Helena Hamerow, a professor of medieval archaeology and a former student of Hawkes, led a project to digitise the archive with funding from the Arts and Humanities Research Council and the Römisch-Germanische Kommission. A number of Hawkes' works were bought to publication posthumously.

In December 2001, the Institute of Archaeology dedicated a plaque and a 1934 lithograph by Paul Nash, 'Landscape of the Megaliths', to the memory of Christopher and Sonia Hawkes. An edited volume was published in her honour in 2007, edited by Martin Henig and Tyler Jo Smith.

Selected publications 

The editors of the 2007 book dedicated to Hawkes noted that there is no comprehensive list of her publications.

Books 

Hawkes, S. C., Grainger, G. (2006). The Anglo-Saxon Cemetery at Finglesham, Kent. Oxford: Oxford University School of Archaeology.
Hawkes, S. C., Grainger, G., Biddulph, E., and Dodd, A. (2003). The Anglo-Saxon cemetery at Worthy Park, Kingsworthy, Hampshire. Oxford: Oxbow.
Hawkes, S. C. (2000). The Anglo-Saxon cemetery of Bifrons, in the parish of Patrixbourne, East Kent. Anglo-Saxon Stud Archaeol Hist 11: 1-94.
Hawkes, S. C. (ed.) (1989). Weapons and Warfare in Anglo-Saxon England. Oxford: Oxford University Committee for Archaeology.
Hawkes, C. F. C. and Hawkes, S. C. (eds.) (1973). Greeks, Celts and Romans. London: Dent.

Articles 

Hawkes, S. C. (1974). The Monkton Brooch. The Antiquaries Journal 54(2): 245–256. 
Hawkes, S. C. (1969). "Finds from two Middle Bronze Age pits at Winnall, Winchester, Hampshire." Proceedings of the Hampshire Field Club and Archaeological Society 26: 5–18.
Hawkes, S. C. and Page, R. I. (1967). Swords and runes in south-east England. The Antiquaries Journal 47 (1): 1–26. 
Hawkes, S. C.; Dunning, G. C. (1961), "Soldiers and Settlers in Britain, Fourth to Fifth Century: With a Catalogue of Animal-Ornamented Buckles and Related Belt-Fittings", Medieval Archaeology, 5: 1–70,

See also

References

Footnotes

Bibliography

External links 

 Material from The Novum Inventorium Sepulchrale

1933 births
1999 deaths
Fellows of the Society of Antiquaries of London
British archaeologists
British women archaeologists
20th-century archaeologists
Alumni of Bedford College, London
Anglo-Saxon archaeologists